Prohor Račanin (c. 1617 – 1678) was a monk-scribe and member of the School of Rača, a scriptorium in Bajina Bašta that was ransacked by the Turks. Most of the monks eventually moved from Serbia to Szentendre in Hungary under the leadership of Arsenije III Crnojević. Monk Prohor, however, left Rača monastery in Bajna Bašta long before the Great Serbian Migration and settled in Belgrade where he taught at a monastery there until he died in 1678. He left several unpublished manuscripts, now held in the archive of the Museum of the Serbian Orthodox Church.

See also
 Jerotej Račanin
 Kiprijan Račanin
 Ćirjak Račanin
 Simeon Račanin
 Teodor Račanin
 Hristifor Račanin
 Grigorije Račanin
 Gavrilo Stefanović Venclović

References 

1610s births
1678 deaths
Year of birth uncertain
Serbian monks
17th-century Christian monks
17th-century Serbian people